CLOC or C-LOC may refer to:

 CLOC a first generation general purpose text analyser program.
 CLOC or C-LOC,  company level operations centre, referring to a company (military unit)#United States